Fikret Özsoy (born 1 January 1965) is a male javelin throw record holder from Turkey. His record throw, of 75.82 metres, was achieved in Rimini, Italy on 30 May 1992.

Achievements

References
 

1965 births
Living people
Fenerbahçe athletes
Turkish male javelin throwers